Chan Wai Ho (born ) is a former Hong Kong professional footballer and current amateur player for Hong Kong First Division club Eastern District.

Chan was a member of the East Asian Games gold medal-winning Hong Kong U-23 squad in 2009. He was also the captain of the Hong Kong senior team from 2010 to 2017. He is sometimes referred to as Tai Ho (Traditional Chinese: 大豪) as a nickname for him and to distinguish him from fellow former Hong Kong international, Lee Chi Ho.

Early life 
Chan Wai Ho lived in Lok Wah Estate, Ngau Tau Kok when he was young and he graduated from Maryknoll Vocational Evening Secondary School. He moved to the player hostel of Rangers in Boundary Street when he was a vocational apprenticeship of Rangers.

Club career

Rangers and Yee Hope 
His father decided that he would join Rangers to be a vocational apprenticeship when Chan Wai Ho was 16 years old. He stayed at Rangers for some months on trial for a professional contract. However, Rangers only gave him a contract after several twists and turns. Eventually, he appeared for the first team a few times in this season.

In 1999–2000 season, Yee Hope chairman Joe Chan invited Chan Wai Ho to join his team. Chan really started his professional career in this season. His number of appearances did not increase after he joined the team, but Arie van der Zouwen thought Chan Wai Ho was one of the best centre-back in Hong Kong and selected him for Hong Kong.

In March 2004, Chan Wai Ho was suspended for 12 games after fighting along with four other Rangers players against Nan Shing Property FC players in a league match in Dongguan on 7 March 2004. The match was suspended and never completed.

In 2006, it was rumoured that he had had a trial with English Premiership Club Reading and would play at the Madejski Stadium in the English Premiership. And in 2007, it was rumoured that he would join Birmingham City after Hong Kong businessman Carson Yeung became the chairman and executive director of the club.

Transfer record 
Chan Wai Ho's transfer fee to South China from Rangers was HK$400,000, which broke the record of the highest local transfer fee and highest transfer fee in Hong Kong First Division League. The highest local transfer fee record was kept by Tam Ah Fook when he moved to Ernest Borel from Happy Valley by HK$140,000 in 1992. The highest overall transfer fee was originally kept by Cheng Siu Chung Ricky when he moved from LD Alajuelense in Costa Rica to South China in 1994–95 season for a fee of US$30,000 (about HK$234,000). But there was rumour in the media that the record has been broken by Chan Siu Ki's 2008 transfer from Kitchee to South China, which cost the Caroliners HK$800,000. The actual fee has not been disclosed.

South China 
On 19 April 2007, it was revealed on HKFA webpage that Chan transferred to South China from Rangers. His registration was just in time for him to represent the team to compete in the Hong Kong FA Cup 2006-07. Chan was described by South China convenor Steven Lo to be the best Chinese centre back in Hong Kong. He made his debut for South China on 20 April 2007 in the Hong Kong FA Cup First Round match against Tai Po.

Chan Wai Ho wore the number 15 at South China to commemorate his former Rangers teammate Cheung Yiu Lun, who died in a traffic accident in October 2003. He was not able to wear the number 15 at Rangers because the number was retired after Cheung's death.

Back to Rangers (HKG) 

It is confirmed that he will join Fourway Rangers on 20 July 2010. But rumours said that he would return to South China in January 2011.

Back to South China 
Chan Wai Ho re-joined South China in the January 2011 transfer window. He felt his form dropped as he also had to work as a coach at Fourway Rangers. He signed a one and a half-year contract.

Chan Wai Ho scored the opening goal in the 2010-11 Hong Kong FA Cup final against Tai Po.

Dreams 
Following South China's decision to self relegate, Chan terminated his contract with the club. He was announced as a player and captain of rebranded Dreams on 26 July 2017.

On 8 June 2018, Chan confirmed that he had renewed his contract for the following season.

On 26 May 2019, Chan accepted another renewal of his contract. However as a result of Dream's decision to self-relegate, Chan was left without work.

On 17 August 2019, he announced his decision to retire from professional football.

Pegasus 
On 2 September 2019, Chan changed his mind and joined Pegasus to be a player and an assistant coach.

Due to the financial strain caused by the 2020 coronavirus pandemic, Pegasus asked its players to either accept a pay cut or agree to a mutual termination. On 7 April 2020, Chan announced that he would terminate his contract with immediate effect.

On 14 July 2020, Chan once again announced his decision to retire from professional football.

International career

Hong Kong
Arie van der Zouwen selected him in Hong Kong national football team in 2000.
In June 2011, Chan Wai Ho was made captain of Hong Kong national football team for the 2014 FIFA World Cup Asian qualification matches against Saudi Arabia.
On 22 March 2013, Chan Wai Ho scored the winner for Hong Kong against Vietnam national football team in the 2015 AFC Asian Cup qualification match. After the match, acting Hong Kong national football team coach Kim Pan Gon said Chan is a top Asian level central defender.

Chan played his farewell match for the representative team on 7 June 2017 against Jordan.

Hong Kong U23
Chan Wai Ho scored twice in the 2009 East Asian Games, against South Korea in a group game and against North Korea in the semi-final. In the penalty shoot-out against North Korea, Chan Wai Ho also scored his penalty.

Chan Wai Ho scored the winning goal for Hong Kong national under-23 football team against Uzbekistan national under-23 football team in the 2010 Asian Games. Hong Kong won the match 1:0.

Honours

Club
South China
Hong Kong First Division: 2007–08, 2008–09, 2009–10, 2012–13
Hong Kong League Cup: 2007–08
Hong Kong Senior Shield: 2009–10
Hong Kong League Cup: 2007–08, 2010–11

International
Hong Kong
East Asian Football Championship Preliminary Competition: 2003
East Asian Football Championship Semifinal Competition: 2009
Long Teng Cup: 2010, 2011
Guangdong-Hong Kong Cup: 2004, 2008, 2009, 2013

Hong Kong U23
East Asian Games: 2009

Individual 
Hong Kong Top Footballers: 2006–07, 2009–10, 2012–13
Hong Kong Top Footballer Awards Most Popular Player: 2012–13

Statistics

Club 
As of 1 July 2012

International 
As of 7 June 2017

Personal life 
Chan Wai Ho became a father on 9 August 2010 when his wife gave birth to a son. He accompanied his wife in the hospital in the morning, then attended the Hong Kong national football team training in the afternoon.

After retirement from professional football, Chan signed an amateur contract with Eastern District. He currently works as a real estate agent during the day.

References

External links 
 Chan Wai Ho at HKFA
 
 
 

1982 births
Living people
Hong Kong footballers
Hong Kong international footballers
Hong Kong First Division League players
Hong Kong Premier League players
Hong Kong Rangers FC players
Metro Gallery FC players
South China AA players
Yee Hope players
Dreams Sports Club players
TSW Pegasus FC players
Footballers at the 2002 Asian Games
Footballers at the 2006 Asian Games
Footballers at the 2010 Asian Games
Association football defenders
Association football central defenders
Association football midfielders
Asian Games competitors for Hong Kong
Hong Kong League XI representative players